Brenden Rice is an American football wide receiver for the USC Trojans. Rice is the son of Pro Football Hall of Fame wide receiver Jerry Rice.

High school career
Rice attended Hamilton High School in Chandler, Arizona and played football as a wide receiver. He also played basketball and was a sprinter on the track team. Rice was rated a three-star recruit and committed to the University of Colorado Boulder on October 15, 2019.

College career
In 2020, Rice had 6 receptions for 120 yards and 2 touchdowns for the Colorado Buffaloes. In 2021, he had 21 receptions for 299 yards, along with 17 kickoff returns for 469 yards and 6 carries for 54 yards.

Rice entered the transfer portal on January 1, 2022. He transferred to USC on January 18, 2022.

References

External links
USC Trojans bio
247Sports bio

Living people
American football wide receivers
USC Trojans football players
Colorado Buffaloes football players
Players of American football from Arizona
Year of birth missing (living people)